Rooms by the Hour is an album by the American band Rustic Overtones, released in 1998. The album drew the attention of several major labels, leading to the band's subsequent contract with Arista Records.

Critical reception
The Providence Journal thought that the band "blends fast-paced lyrics in a G. Love style and the instrumentation of a ska band—percussion, sax, another upright bass—to 'Feast or Famine'."

AllMusic wrote that the "energetic, horn-powered rock incorporates elements of jazz and R&B."

Track listing
 "Feast or Famine"
 "Girl Germs"
 "Check"
 "The Letter"
 "Hardest Way Possible"
 "Kicking and Screaming"
 "Pink Belly"
 "Sugarcoat"
 "The Heist"
 "Machine Maker"
 "History Crush"
 "Shaker"
 "Iron Boots"
 "Outtro"

2008 Deluxe Edition bonus tracks
 "Cherry"
 "Last Night's Band"
 "Room 6"

References

Rustic Overtones albums
1998 albums